John Edgar Scholes (2 September 1917 – 15 July 1989) was a sailor from New Zealand.

Scholes was born in Kyogle, New South Wales, Australia in 1917. He represented New Zealand at the 1972 Summer Olympics in Kiel. Scholes took 21st place in the Soling with Steve Marten as helmsman and Con Linton as fellow crew member. Scholes died at Auckland, New Zealand, on 15 July 1989.

References

1917 births
1989 deaths
New Zealand male sailors (sport)
Sailors at the 1972 Summer Olympics – Soling
Olympic sailors of New Zealand